"Intro" (stylized in all-caps) is a song by American rapper DaBaby, released as the lead single and opening track from his second studio album Kirk on September 19, 2019.

The song peaked at number 13 on the US Billboard Hot 100.

Music and lyrics 
The song explores themes of family and DaBaby handling his newfound success. The song strays away from his usual comedic subject matter, which is synonymous with his music. He explains how he found out about his father's passing only moments before he was informed that his debut studio album, Baby on Baby, debuted atop the Billboard Mainstream R&B/Hip-Hop chart.

The song is produced by DJ K.i.D, who sampled NSYNC's 1998 rendition of "O Holy Night" for the song. The song's chorus makes references to Martin and Gina, characters from the TV series Martin, and tennis players and sisters Venus and Serena Williams.

Music video 
The music video was released on September 20, 2019. It begins with DaBaby walking towards a casket at a church, before then cutting to a scene of DaBaby celebrating his newfound success. The video, directed by Reel Goats, was shot in Hawaii. As of April 2021 the video has over 60 million views on YouTube.

Critical reception 
The song received positive reviews, with Rolling Stones Charles Holmes deeming it a "heart-wrenching portrait of loss", calling it DaBaby's "best song yet", as DaBaby drops his comedically tough facade in favor of a more sincere approach to the song.

Chart performance 
The song peaked at number 13 on the US Billboard Hot 100, becoming his third song to reach the top 20 on the chart, and second as the lead artist.

Charts

Weekly charts

Year-end charts

Certifications

References 

2019 singles
2019 songs
DaBaby songs
Songs written by DaBaby
Interscope Records singles